Breve is the diacritical mark ˘.

Breve or Breves may also refer to:

 Breve (music), or double whole note
 Breve, a mark used to denote a short syllable in scansion
 Breve, a type of milk coffee
 Brèves, commune in Nièvre, France
 Breves, Pará, a municipality in Brazil
 Breves Airport
 Papal brief or breve, a formal document emanating from the Pope

See also 
 
 
 Brevet (disambiguation)
 Bréval, a commune in Yvelines, France